Hélène Lipietz (born 7 May 1958) is a French politician. She serves as a Senator for Seine-et-Marne.

Biography

Early life
Hélène Lipietz was born on 7 May 1958 in Paris. Her father, Georges Lipietz (1922-2003), was a Jewish Polish immigrants in France, who was arrested and interned during World War II. Her brother is Alain Lipietz, also a green politician. She graduated from Paris West University Nanterre La Défense, where she received a law degree.

Career
She is a lawyer.

She is a member of Europe Ecology – The Greens. From 2004 to 2010, she served on the regional council of Île-de-France. Since 17 June 2012 she has served as a Senator for Seine-et-Marne, replacing Nicole Bricq.

Personal life
She is married, and has three children.

References

1958 births
Living people
Politicians from Paris
University of Paris alumni
French Senators of the Fifth Republic
20th-century French women lawyers
21st-century French women lawyers
20th-century French lawyers
21st-century French lawyers
Women members of the Senate (France)
21st-century French women politicians
Senators of Seine-et-Marne
French people of Polish-Jewish descent